Black Arrow is a 1944 American Western Serial film directed by Lew Landers and starring Roberts Scott, Adele Jergens, Robert Williams and Kenneth MacDonald.

Plot
Buck Sherman and Jake Jackson, a couple of evil carpetbaggers, illegally enter a Navajo reservation to prospect for gold and end up killing Aranho, the Navajos chief. Black Arrow, presumed Aranho's son, refuses to kill the Indian agent, Tom Whitney, in revenge, as demanded by Navajo law. Black Arrow is driven off the reservation for his reluctance to kill Whitney and decides to join forces with Pancho, Mary Brent and Whitney to track down the men who killed the chief (Sherman and Jackson).

Cast
 Mark Roberts as Black Arrow (as Robert Scott) 
 Adele Jergens as Mary Brent
 Robert B. Williams as Buck Sherman (as Robert Williams)
 Kenneth MacDonald as Jake Jackson
 Charles Middleton as Tom Whitney
 Elmo Lincoln as Chief Aranho
 Martin Garralaga as Pancho
 Chief Thundercloud as the medicine man
 George J. Lewis as the "Snake-Who-Walks"
 I. Stanford Jolley as Tobis Becker
 Stanley Price as Wade
 Ferris Taylor as the Sheriff
 Dale Van Sickel as a henchman
 Dan White as Paul Brent
 Forrest Taylor as Prescott
 Nick Thompson as Atalan
 Eddie Parker as Hank
 Bud Osbourne as Fred

Chapter titles
 The City of Gold
 Signal of Fear
 The Seal of Doom
 Terror of the Badlands
 The Secret of the Vault
 Appointment with Death
 The Chamber of Horror
 The Vanishing Dagger
 Escape from Death
 The Gold Cache
 The Curse of the Killer
 Test by Torture
 The Sign of Evil
 An Indian's Revenge
 Black Arrow Triumphs

Fact
In this serial, the completely unknown Robert Scott starred as Black Arrow. It was his first and only film leading role. He later changed his name to Mark Roberts and starred as reporter Hildy Johnson in the 1949-1950 syndicated television series The Front Page.

See also
List of American films of 1944

External links 
 
 
 Cinefania.com

1944 films
1940s English-language films
American black-and-white films
1944 Western (genre) films
Columbia Pictures film serials
Films directed by Lew Landers
Films directed by B. Reeves Eason
American Western (genre) films
1940s American films